In the Bible, the word "flesh" is often used simply as a description of the fleshy parts of an animal, including that of human beings, and typically in reference to dietary laws and sacrifice.  Less often it is used as a metaphor for familial or kinship relations, and (particularly in the Christian tradition) as a metaphor to describe sinful tendencies. A related turn of phrase identifies certain sins as "carnal" sins, from Latin caro, carnis, meaning "flesh."

Etymology 
The word flesh (from the Old English flǣsc, of Germanic origin) is translated from the Hebrew lexemes bāśār and šĕēr, and from the Greek σάρξ (sárx), and κρέας (kréas).

Meaning and Use

Old Testament 
In the Hebrew Bible, the way of all flesh is a religious phrase that in its original sense meant death, the fate of all living things. This phrase does not appear verbatim in the King James Bible either, but is clearly prefigured in that translation:
 And God said unto Noah, The end of all flesh is come before me; for the earth is filled with violence through them; and, behold, I will destroy them with the earth. (Genesis 6:13)

Samuel Butler, by contrast, used The Way of All Flesh as the title of a semi-autobiographical family saga, using the phrase to refer ambiguously to either the religious or to a sexual sense.

New Testament 

Saint Paul makes this connection in Romans 7:18, in which he says:

However, the (fourth century) Apostles' creed affirms carnis resurrectionem (the resurrection of the flesh), the body being an essential part of a person.

In religious language, the "flesh" took on specific connotations of sexual sins. It was in this sense that the nineteenth century critic Robert Buchanan condemned a Fleshly School of Poetry, accusing Swinburne, Rossetti, and Morris with preoccupation with sex and sensual matters.

A traditional turn of phrase condemns "the world, the flesh, and the Devil" as the sources of temptation to sin. This specific phrase does not appear in the King James Bible, but a similar sense appears in passages such as 1 John 2:16:

The phrase definitely appears in the writings of Abelard, who writes that "there are three things that tempt us: the world, the flesh, and the devil."  The litany of the 1662 edition of the Book of Common Prayer contains the petition:

and the English translations of Roman Catholic litanies often contain a similar petition.

This traditional turn of phrase gave rise to a number of films and books entitled The world, the flesh, and the devil.

Analysis and interpretation

Roman Catholic Church 
In the Roman Catholic Church the flesh has a twofold relation with the bodyless spirit. On one hand, the Holy Spirit God has made the Incarnation of the Son of God into the holy womb of the Most Blessed Virgin Mary, so as to say that that Holy Spirit God has naturally generated the flesh of Christ in His earthly mortal body. But most of Christians also believe in the pre-existence of Christ from the eternity in a human-divine body which was generated by God the Father before all centuries and, more particularly, before the creation of Genesis 1. His body pre-existed from ever and for ever, always keeping a dyophysite nature which is both human and divine.

On the other hand, the human-divine flesh of God the Father and of God the Son created all the visible and the invisible creatures, as it is stated by the Nicene Creed. The Father and the Son had created the angels and the soul of Adam and Eve. Hence, his flesh had the power to create the bodyless angels.

Christians also believe that at time of its conception the unborn child receives a unique soul which is created by God for him and can't be destroyed nor annihilated, even by God himself: once created, it is destinated to live forever. Each flesh has a unique soul and, vice versa, each soul has a unique flesh and it isn't ubicated in one or more articular parts, but, on the contrary, it is all in any single part of the flesh it has taken at the time of the birth. The soul can't transmigrate in a different body, both human or animal.

At the time of death, the soul leaves the body and has its own personal and particular judgment. At the end of times, it is followed by the Resurrection of the flesh for a last judgment which is universal and that can have a twofold conclusion: to be a judgment and resurrection of eternal salvation in the Paradise or in the Purgatory, or to be of eternal condemnation into the Hell. The Resurrection of the flesh is mainly finalized to make perfect the Mystical Body of Christ and the related Communion of saints.

The original sin is heired by children from both their parents through the flesh. It is forgiven uniquely by way of the sacramental grace of the Roman Catholic Baptism. The Blessed Virgin Mary is the unique human creature which is believed to be conceived without the original sin and also the unique which has come to Paradise with same the human flesh she had since her birth. Those statements are the truths of faith affirmed in the two dogmas of the Immaculate Conception and of the Assumption of the Blessed Virgin Mary to Heaven in body and soul. She is also believed  to have a unique Son and to have kept preserved her virginity toward all her earthly life.

More particularly, the dogma of the Perpetual virginity of Mary states that Jesus Christ God was born without any union of human fleshes. In a complementary way, the Nicene Creed affirms that he was incarnated in the womb of the Blessed Virgin Mary by the work of the Holy Spirit God. Jesus is believed to be the unique human flesh conceived and born in a virginal way, since he and he uniquely is believed to be God himself.

See also
Anicca
Christianity and sexuality
Judaism and sexuality
Materialism
Mortification (theology)
Religious male circumcision
Religious views on female genital mutilation
Sensualism
Sex in the Hebrew Bible
Sic transit gloria mundi
The world, the flesh, and the devil
Theology of the Body
This too shall pass
Vanitas

References

External links

Catholic Encyclopedia: Mortification: ""If you live after the flesh", says the apostle, "you shall die, but if through the spirit you mortify the deeds of the flesh, you shall live" (Romans 8:13; cf. also Colossians 3:5, and Galatians 5:24)."

Biblical exegesis
New Testament words and phrases
Christian terminology